Dance Plus 6 is the sixth season of reality show Dance Plus that premiered on 14 September 2021 on Disney+ Hotstar and streamed weekdays until 15 October 2021. It later premiered on Star Plus on 31 October 2021 and aired Every Sunday Night until 16 January 2022. It is produced by Urban Brew Studios in association with Frames Productions. 

This season is judged by Remo D'Souza, its captains were Salman Yusuff Khan, Punit Pathak and Shakti Mohan, and it was hosted by Raghav Juyal.

Super judge and captains
Remo D'Souza, the super judge, is an Indian dancer, choreographer, actor and film director.

The following are the three captains of this season

Shakti Mohan
Punit Pathak
Salman Yusuff Khan

Teams 
Contestant info

Dance styles of teams

Semi-finalists (Top 6)

Finalists (Top 3)

Winner of weekly Battle Plus of captains
From Dance Plus season 6, D'Souza added a new challenge for captains. Here Remo introduced a dance icon challenge with the winning team getting a new trophy called as Battle Plus. The winning team gets a chance to perform/battle in the final showdown.

Special guests

Through direct contact

Through video conferencing

Score chart
Captain's info

Contestant info

 (P)  Captain Punit's challenge
 (S)  Captain Shakti's challenge
 (SL) Captain Salman's challenge
 (FC) Fan's Challenge Round
 (MD) Mithun Da Challenge Round
 (DI) Dance Icon Round
 (IS) International Squad Round
 (SD) Final Showdown
 (B) Bonus battle
 (50 score) actual score (40)+ double plus score (10) = 50 points

The scores were given in the following manner: 
1. A captain can score out of 10 and Super Judge Remo can score out of 20. Remo also had the power to give double plus to the team and the team got additional 10 points. 
2. From season 6, D'Souza added a new challenge for captains. Here Remo introduced a dance icon challenge with the winning team getting a new trophy called as Battle Plus. The winning team gets a chance to perform/battle in the final showdown along with top two teams from Captain's challenge round. 
3. Second Round is Captain's challenge round. Each captain gave a challenge. One performer from each  team performed. Top two scoring teams go for final showdown and performed with winning team of Battle Plus. 
4. One performer from each team in final showdown performed. The winner of final showdown is decided by Remo. The team whose artist won the final showdown is the winner of that week. 
5. Winning captain chose two performers from their team to advance as Finalists and Remo chose amongst them.

Winners of weekly final showdowns

References

External links

 Dance+6 on Disney+ Hotstar

2021 Indian television seasons